Kosuke Tomonaga (born 22 July 1980) is a Japanese volleyball player. He competed in the men's tournament at the 2008 Summer Olympics.

References

1980 births
Living people
Japanese men's volleyball players
Olympic volleyball players of Japan
Volleyball players at the 2008 Summer Olympics
Sportspeople from Nagasaki Prefecture
Volleyball players at the 2006 Asian Games
Asian Games competitors for Japan